Macraspis cincta is a species of beetles of the family Scarabaeidae.

References

Scarabaeidae
Beetles described in 1782